Benito Juárez Municipality is a Mexican municipality located in the southern extreme of the state of Zacatecas on the edge of the Canyon of Tlaltenango.

Overview
To the north, the municipality is bordered by the municipality of Tepechitlán, and Chimaltitan, Jalisco. To the south, the municipality is bordered by the municipalities of Teúl de González Ortega and Tequila, Jalisco. To the east it is bordered by Teúl de González Ortega, and Santa María de la Paz. To the west, it is bordered by the municipality of San Martín de Bolaños, Jalisco.

The municipality covers an area of 329 km². Its rural communities include El Durazno, Tonilco, Mesa de Núñez., Llano Grande, Los Campos, San Lucas, Potrerillos, Los Sauces, Mesa de Rayos, Tecolotes, Cuevas Chicas, Mesa de Arellanos y Las Cruces.
 		
The municipality was formed in 1962 when it was separated from Teúl de González Ortega. It was originally inhabited by the Caxcan people. During the 18th century, Spanish settlers started to settle the area. Florencia was a staunch Catholic town during the Cristero rebellion in the 1920s and '30s. This forced many of the families to flee into caves and mountains to escape violence when national forces showed up. 
 
The primary economic activity is cattle ranching. The municipality has experienced a drain of population as a result of emigration to bigger cities and abroad to the United States. 
 		
The town celebrates its patron saints' day on December 8 in honor of the Immaculate Conception of the Virgin Mary. another important holiday is in August to celebrate its emigrant community abroad. 
 		
Some typical dishes include: pipian, a type of mole made with pumpkin seeds; gorditas de horno, a type of bread made of corn flour and milk curd. The typical wedding dish is birria with rice and beans. Tequila is the most popular as the town is close to the agave cultivation area.

In 2010, the municipality had a total of 4,854 inhabitants, of which 2,406 lived in the municipal seat.

References

External links and sources
 Municipio de Benito juarez
 Mexico's Instituto Nacional de Estadística Geografía e Informática
 Mexican postal service 
 state of Zacatecas(official) municipal(county) map

Populated places in Zacatecas